Ramon Caguicla Aquino (August 31, 1917 – March 31, 1993) was the 15th Chief Justice of the Supreme Court of the Philippines.

He was appointed on November 20, 1985, the last Chief Justice appointed by President Ferdinand Marcos.

Personal life

Aquino was born on August 31, 1917, in Lemery, Batangas to Luciano Aquino y Manalo and Arsenia Caguicla y Sangalang. He obtained his Bachelor of Laws from the University of the Philippines in 1939 and placed sixth in the 1939 bar exam, with a grade of 89.1%.

He was the husband of Carolina Griño-Aquino, who is also a Bar topnotcher, and who would be later appointed as associate justice during the Aquino administration in 1988. Grino-Aquino served as an Associate Justice of the Supreme Court from February 2, 1988 until her retirement on October 22, 1993.

He was a law professor and author of several books in civil, criminal and commercial laws.  He held several government positions before being appointed as Associate Justice to the Philippine Supreme Court on October 29, 1973.

He resigned on March 6, 1987, following the request of the new Aquino government.

Role
A classmate of President Marcos, he would put 'no part' in the decisions involving the government.

References

Cruz, Isagani A. (2000). "Res Gestae: A Brief History of the Supreme Court". Rex Book Store, Manila

External links
Supreme Court of the Philippines - Ramon Aquino biodata

Chief justices of the Supreme Court of the Philippines
Associate Justices of the Supreme Court of the Philippines
1917 births
1993 deaths
Filipino educators
University of the Philippines alumni
People from Batangas
20th-century Filipino lawyers